"I Know Him So Well" is a duet from the concept album and subsequent musical Chess by Tim Rice, Benny Andersson and Björn Ulvaeus. It was originally sung by Elaine Paige (as Florence) and Barbara Dickson (as Svetlana). In this duet, two women – Svetlana, the Russian chess champion's estranged wife, and Florence, his mistress – express their bittersweet feelings for him and at seeing their relationships fall apart.

History
The chorus of the song is based on the chorus of "I Am an A", a song performed live during Andersson and Ulvaeus' group ABBA's 1977 tour. Although "I Am an A" was never released officially, it circulated on various bootlegs and is readily available on YouTube.

Original version
The duet was first released worldwide on the Chess double LP, often referred to as a concept album or album musical, in the autumn of 1984. Later it was released as a single by Paige and Dickson, the duet reaching number one in the UK Singles Chart for four weeks in 1985. They laid down their vocals separately and never met during the recording of the song, only for the video and subsequent performances on Top of the Pops and the European tours. This recording remains in the Guinness Book of Records as the biggest selling UK chart single ever by a female duo. Paige also appeared in the original London West End stage production of Chess. The song peaked at number 21 in Australia.

In the United Kingdom on 18 September 2004, the BBC's All-Time Greatest Love Songs (hosted by Lionel Richie) saw the duet performed live by Paige and Dickson, together for the first time in 20 years, to a rapturous reception. Paige played her solo demo recording of the song on her BBC Radio 2 show, Elaine Paige on Sunday.

In January 2011, the Official Charts Company released a list of the top 10 All Time Best Selling Duets in which "I Know Him So Well" was placed seventh in the chart.

Paige and Dickson also recorded Spanish-language lyrics for release as "Lo Creo Conocer". The single was never released though.

Charts

Weekly charts

Year-end charts

Original recording credits
 Benny Andersson – keyboards, synthesizers
 Barbara Dickson – vocals
 Anders Eljas – keyboards, synthesizers
 Rutger Gunnarsson – bass
 Per Lindvall – drums, percussion
 Elaine Paige – vocals
 Lasse Wellander – guitars
 Writers and producers – Benny Andersson, Tim Rice, Björn Ulvaeus
 Arrangement – Benny Andersson, Anders Eljas
 Engineer and mixer – Michael B. Tretow

Cissy Houston and Whitney Houston version

In 1987, a studio version of "I Know Him So Well" was recorded as a duet by Cissy Houston and her daughter Whitney Houston for Whitney's second album, Whitney. It was released as the 6th and  final single from Whitney on 30 November 1988 in Australia, Germany, Netherlands, and Spain. There was no official music video produced for the Houston duet of song, however there are live performance video-recordings. The song version was included in the Whitney Houston North American leg of the Moment of Truth World Tour. The single was not promoted as heavily as previous singles from Whitney.

Critical reception
Robert Hilburn of the Los Angeles Times praised the duet thus: "The album ends on a graceful, intimate note as Houston is joined by her mother, singer Cissy Houston, on "I Know Him So Well," a ballad from the musical Chess. Rolling Stone's Vince Alleti criticized the song and production: "Walden covers all these bases, out-schlocking Masser with "I Know Him So Well" — a genuine if frankly derivative show tune (from Tim Rice's Chess) treated here with deadly reverence..." St. Petersburg Times called the duet lifting and praised the mother's role: "Mom adds a brief, welcome moment of grainy soulfulness to the album."

Chart performance
This single peaked at number 46 in Germany and in the Netherlands it peaked at number 14.

Track listings and formats
CD single (Germany)
"I Know Him So Well" – 4:26
"Just The Lonely Talking Again" – 5:30
"You're Still My Man" – 4:15

7" Single (Germany)
A "I Know Him So Well" – 4:26
B "Just The Lonely Talking Again" – 5:30
12" Single (Germany)
A1 "I Know Him So Well" – 4:26
B1 "Just The Lonely Talking Again" – 5:30
B2 "You're Still My Man" – 4:15

Chart positions

Steps version

British musical group Steps originally recorded "I Know Him So Well" for the 1999 Abbamania compilation, and the song later appeared on Steps' own The Last Dance collection. It was released as a single together with "Words Are Not Enough" in 2001 as the group's fifteenth single release, and the group's last single to be released before their Boxing Day split later the same month.

Chart performance
The single entered the charts at number five in the United Kingdom but quickly fell out of the top ten to number 14 the following week. It spent eleven weeks in total in the top 75 despite much lower sales than the group's previous singles. It also peaked at number 21 in Ireland.

Track listings
UK CD single
 "Words Are Not Enough" – 3:24
 "I Know Him So Well" – 4:14
 "Bittersweet" – 3:58
 "Words Are Not Enough" (video) – 3:24

UK cassette single
 "Words Are Not Enough" – 3:24
 "I Know Him So Well" – 4:14
 "Bittersweet" – 3:58

Personnel
 Claire Richards – lead vocals
 Lisa Scott-Lee – lead vocals
 Faye Tozer – lead vocals
 Lee Latchford-Evans – backing vocals
 Ian "H" Watkins – backing vocals

Charts

Geraldine McQueen and Susan Boyle version

"I Know Him So Well" was recorded by  Peter Kay and Susan Boyle for Comic Relief 2011, with Kay appearing as his alter ego Geraldine McQueen. Their version reached number 11 on the UK Singles Chart. A parody music video was also created.

Melanie C version

"I Know Him So Well" was also covered by English recording artist Melanie C. The song was the first single to be taken from Melanie C's musical theatre-inspired and sixth studio album Stages. The song is a duet with Melanie C's fellow Spice Girls group member Emma Bunton. The song was released as a single on 11 November 2012. The b-side of the single is a cover of "You'll Never Walk Alone" from the musical Carousel. The music video for the song premiered on YouTube on 12 November 2012.

Formats and track listings
These are the formats and track listings of major single releases of "I Know Him So Well".

 Digital download
 "I Know Him So Well"
 "You'll Never Walk Alone"

 Limited CD single
 "I Know Him So Well"
 "You'll Never Walk Alone"

 Digital download
 "I Know Him So Well" 

Live performances
Melanie C and Bunton performed the song on

 This Morning BBC Children in Need Live at Shepherd's Bush Empire The Alan Titchmarsh Show Loose WomenCharts

Release history

Additional covers
The song has been covered in non-charting versions by several notable performers.
Originally recorded in 1985 during sessions for The Broadway Album, Barbra Streisand released her version featuring Mr. Mister’s Richard Page in her 1991 box set Just for the Record...Pianist Richard Clayderman included an instrumental version on his 1987 album, Songs of Love.
Singers John Barrowman and Daniel Boys covered the song on Barrowman's 2008 album Music Music Music.
In 2014, Charlotte Jaconelli and Kerry Ellis performed the song on Jaconelli's solo debut album, Solitaire.
Sheridan Smith sang the song with Amanda Holden on Holden's 2020 debut album Songs from My Heart''.
In 2022, YouTuber singer/songwriter AJ Rafael released a single version along with filmmaker and singer Chance Calloway to raise funds for The Trevor Project.

References

1980s ballads
1984 songs
1984 singles
1985 singles
2001 singles
2011 singles
2012 singles
Elaine Paige songs
Barbara Dickson songs
Barbra Streisand songs
Charity singles
Comic Relief singles
Contemporary R&B ballads
Emma Bunton songs
Female vocal duets
Jive Records singles
Melanie C songs
Pete Waterman Entertainment singles
Pop ballads
Songs from Chess (musical)
Songs with lyrics by Tim Rice
Songs written by Benny Andersson and Björn Ulvaeus
Soul ballads
Steps (group) songs
Susan Boyle songs
UK Singles Chart number-one singles
Whitney Houston songs